In mathematics, the Fabry gap theorem is a result about the analytic continuation of complex power series whose non-zero terms are of orders that have a certain "gap" between them. Such a power series is "badly behaved" in the sense that it cannot be extended to be an analytic function anywhere on the boundary of its disc of convergence.

The theorem may be deduced from the first main theorem of Turán's method.

Statement of the theorem

Let 0 < p1 < p2 < ... be a sequence of integers such that the sequence pn/n diverges to ∞.  Let (αj)j∈N be a sequence of complex numbers such that the power series

has radius of convergence 1. Then the unit circle is a natural boundary for the series f.

Converse
A converse to the theorem was established by George Pólya.  If lim inf pn/n is finite then there exists a power series with exponent sequence pn, radius of convergence equal to 1, but for which the unit circle is not a natural boundary.

See also
 Gap theorem (disambiguation)
 Lacunary function
 Ostrowski–Hadamard gap theorem

References
 
 

Mathematical series
Theorems in complex analysis